In enzymology, a thiamine kinase is an enzyme that catalyzes the chemical reaction

ATP + thiamine  ADP + thiamine phosphate

Thus, the two substrates of this enzyme are ATP and thiamine, whereas its two products are ADP and thiamine phosphate.

This enzyme belongs to the family of transferases, specifically those transferring phosphorus-containing groups (phosphotransferases) with an alcohol group as acceptor.  The systematic name of this enzyme class is ATP:thiamine phosphotransferase. Other names in common use include thiamin kinase (phosphorylating), thiamin phosphokinase, ATP:thiamin phosphotransferase, and thiamin kinase.  This enzyme participates in thiamine metabolism.

References

 

EC 2.7.1
Enzymes of unknown structure